Dane Pharrell Scarlett (born 24 March 2004) is an English professional footballer who plays as a forward for Portsmouth, on loan from Premier League club Tottenham Hotspur.

Club career
Scarlett was part of the Tottenham Under-18s team in the 2019–20 season, however, the season ended prematurely for him after a knee injury. He started playing with the first team in the pre-season friendly matches in August 2020, but returned to the Under-18s at the start of the 2020–21 season. He scored ten goals and made three assists in eight games; four goals, three of them headers, were scored in the Under-18s game on 21 November 2020 against Southampton that ended in a 7–0 win.

His performance led to an appearance on the bench in the Europa League game against Ludogorets Razgrad on 26 November, and he made his debut for Tottenham coming on as a substitute for Lucas Moura in this game. At the age of 16 years and 247 days, he became the youngest player to have appeared in a senior first team competitive game for Tottenham, beating the previous record held by John Bostock. The record lasted until 10 January 2021 when Alfie Devine made his debut at the age of 16 years 163 days. On 12 January 2021, he scored five goals for the U18 team in the 6–2 win against Newport County in the FA Youth Cup. Scarlett made his Premier League debut, coming off the bench during stoppage time against West Bromwich Albion, on 7 February 2021. Tottenham manager José Mourinho said, "I wanted to be the one to put him on in a Premier League match. Because I know that he will be somebody in a few years." On 24 February, he became the youngest player to make an assist in the Europa League since Kylian Mbappé in a 4–0 win against Wolfsberger AC, teeing up Carlos Vinicius for the goal.  On 28 March 2021, Scarlett officially signed his first professional contract with Tottenham Hotspur. The contract for the young forward runs until 2023, having been triggered following his 17th birthday.

Scarlett made his first start for Tottenham on 19 August 2021 in the inaugural UEFA Europa Conference League competition playing against F.C. Paços de Ferreira, which ended in a 1–0 defeat. After the 2021–22 season finished Scarlett signed a new contract with Tottenham until 2026.

On 27 July 2022, Scarlett was loaned to League One side Portsmouth ahead of the 2022–23 League One season. He made his first appearance for the club on 5 August 2022 in a 2–0 win against Cheltenham, and scored his first professional goal in a 1–0 win against Port Vale on 27 August.

International career
Born in England, Scarlett is of Jamaican descent. He made one appearance for the England national under-16 football team in August 2019, playing against Denmark where he scored both goals in a 2–0 win.

On 2 September 2021, Scarlett made his debut for the England U19s and scored during a 2–0 victory over Italy at St. George's Park. On 17 June 2022, Scarlett was included in the squad for the 2022 UEFA European Under-19 Championship. He scored twice in a group stage match against Serbia. Scarlett started in the final as England won the tournament with a 3–1 extra time victory over Israel on 1 July 2022.

On 21 September 2022, Scarlett made his England U20 debut as a substitute during a 3-0 victory over Chile at the Pinatar Arena.

Career statistics

Honours
England U19s

 UEFA European Under-19 Championship: 2022

References

External links
Profile @ Tottenhamhotspur.com

2004 births
Living people
English footballers
England youth international footballers
English sportspeople of Jamaican descent
Association football forwards
Tottenham Hotspur F.C. players
Portsmouth F.C. players
Footballers from Greater London
Black British sportspeople
Premier League players
English Football League players